The Great American Eagle Tragedy is the second and last album by the psychedelic band Earth Opera, recorded in 1969. It is marked by departure of Bill Stevenson and his harpsichord sound, using more guest musicians than on the debut album and use of pedal steel by Bill Keith. The album also had better success on charts then the previous one, but soon after, the group disbanded, paving the way for solo careers mainly for Pete Rowan and David Grisman.

Track listing 
All compositions by Peter Rowan, unless otherwise noted
 "Home to You" – 4:27
 "Mad Lydia's Waltz" – 3:47
 "Alfie Finney" — (Paul Dillon) – 2:35
 "Sanctuary From the Law" – 2:54
 "All Winter Long" – 5:56
 "The American Eagle Tragedy" – 10:36
 "Roast Beef Love" – 3:16
 "It's Love" – 4:05

Personnel
 Peter Rowan – vocals, guitar, saxophone
 David Grisman – mandolin, mandocello, keyboards, saxophone, vocals
 Paul Dillon – guitar, drums, vocals
 Billy Mundi – percussion, drums
 John Nagy – bass, violoncello, mandocello
 Jack Bonus – flute, sax, wind
 Herb Bushler – bass
 John Cale – guitar, viola, vocals
 Richard Grando – saxophone
 David Horowitz – organ, piano, keyboards
 Bill Keith – pedal steel, steel guitar
 Bob Zachary – percussion, triangle

References

1969 albums
Earth Opera albums
Elektra Records albums